Seppo Hannu Antero Repo (born September 21, 1947 in Joensuu, Finland) is a retired professional ice hockey player who played in the SM-liiga.  He played for Jokerit, SaPKo, and TPS.  He was inducted into the Finnish Hockey Hall of Fame in 1990.

He played one season in the WHA, spending the 1976-77 season with the Phoenix Roadrunners, playing alongside countrymen Pekka Rautakallio, Juhani Tamminen and Lauri Mononen. He was also part of the Finnish National Team that played one game that counted in the WHA's official standings during the 1978-79 season. He scored 29 goals and 60 points in 80 games his one season with Phoenix.

External links
 Finnish Hockey Hall of Fame bio

1947 births
Living people
Finnish ice hockey centres
Herning Blue Fox players
Jokipojat players
Jokerit players
Kokudo Keikaku players
KooKoo players
Peliitat Heinola players
People from Joensuu
Phoenix Roadrunners (WHA) players
SaPKo players
HC TPS players
Olympic ice hockey players of Finland
Ice hockey players at the 1972 Winter Olympics
Sportspeople from North Karelia